Dan Andersson (6 April 1888 in Ludvika – 16 September 1920 in Stockholm) was a Swedish author, poet, and composer. He sometimes used the pen name Black Jim. Although he is counted among the Swedish proletarian authors, his works are not limited to that genre.

Early life

Born in Grangärde parish in the province of Dalarna, Andersson grew up under harsh conditions in the village of Skattlösberg. His father Adolf was a primary school teacher there, and his mother Augusta had also taught in the local school. The village lies in the "Finn Woods" of southern Dalarna, where Forest Finns had immigrated to cultivate new land. On his father's side, Andersson descended from these Finnish settlers. Andersson took odd jobs during the first years of his life, for instance as a forestry worker and school teacher. He found it difficult to make a living. The family considered trying to find a better life in the United States, and Andersson was sent to live in Forest Lake, Minnesota, as a 14-year-old in 1902 to see if it would be possible. But he wrote to them, saying that there were no better opportunities there than in Sweden, upon which his father asked him to come home. The family moved from Skattlösberg in 1905, but Andersson returned there to live with his parents and siblings from 1911 to 1915. During this period, he wrote a number of stories and poems. In 1918 Andersson married primary schoolteacher Olga Turesson, the sister of troubadour .

Brunnsvik
During 1914–1915, Andersson studied at the Brunnsvik folk high school, with, among others, future authors Harry Blomberg and Ragnar Jändel. He was also a good friend of Karl Lärka, who would become a well-known documentary photographer. From this time onwards he was to become active as an author, writing poems and songs about his home region, which are read and sung almost a century later in Swedish homes. Gunde Johansson and Thorstein Bergman are among the best known of his interpreters. He was a co-worker at the Social Democratic newspaper Ny Tid in Gothenburg 1917–1918, and he also translated texts by Rudyard Kipling and Charles Baudelaire into Swedish. Despite his simple upbringing, Andersson was highly educated.

Death
Dan Andersson died in room 11 at Hotel Hellman in Stockholm on 16 September 1920, where he had gone to look for a job at the newspaper Social-Demokraten. The hotel staff had used hydrogen cyanide against bedbugs and had not cleared the room as prescribed. At 3 p.m. Andersson was found dead. At the same time, insurance inspector Elliott Eriksson from Bollnäs also died. The hotel was located at Bryggaregatan 5 in Stockholm, but it was demolished in the 1960s.

Andersson is buried at Lyviken Cemetery in Ludvika.

Legacy

Dan Andersson's poetry enjoys a broad popularity among the Swedish people because of its naturalist mysticism and searching for God. In 2005, Sofia Karlsson recorded a new interpretation of 11 of Andersson's songs on her album Svarta ballader, which received a Grammis award in both Sweden and Denmark, and before that time his poems had been sung by musicians including the Hootenanny Singers, Love Explosion, and Fred Åkerström. Joakim Thåström has also referenced Andersson in a number of his songs.

In 1988, at the centenary of Andersson's birth, Posten, the Swedish postal service, published two stamps in his honour. In Ludvika, a Dan Andersson week is celebrated the first week of every August. In Ludvika there is also a Dan Andersson museum and a statue of him. A bust is also to be found at Järntorget in Gothenburg.

Works in Swedish 

 Brevkort från Grangärde finnmark (1903)
  (1914)
  (1915)
 Det kallas vidskepelse (1916)
 Svarta ballader (1917)
 De tre hemlösa (1918)
 David Ramms arv (1919)
 . Berättelser från norra Amerika (1920)
 Efterlämnade dikter (1922)

Works in English

Modern Swedish Poetry Pt. 1, 1929.
Modern Swedish Short Stories, 1934.
Charcoal Burner’s Ballad and Other Poems, 1943.
Scandinavian Songs and Ballads, 1950.
The Last Night in Paindalen, 1958.
Swedish Songs, LP, 1974.
Swedes On Love, CD, 1991.
Dan Andersson in English, 1994.
Poems of Dan Andersson, 2003.

His life in English
A History of Swedish Literature, 1961.
A History of Swedish Literature, 1989.
A History of Swedish Literature, 1996.

References

External links

Dan Andersson at Authors' Calendar
Translations
Christmas-song in the Finnmark (Julvisa i Finnmarken)
A musician's last journey (En spelmans jordafärd)
For my sister and four other poems

Poems by Dan Andersson
Twelve Poems
Videos

1888 births
1920 deaths
Swedish people of Forest Finnish descent
People from Ludvika Municipality
Swedish-language poets
Swedish people of Finnish descent
Swedish socialists
Writers from Dalarna
20th-century Swedish poets
20th-century Swedish male writers